Radotina is an extinct genus of placoderm from the early Devonian of Europe.

References

 Dinosaurs to Dodos: An Encyclopedia of Extinct Animals by Don Lessem and Jan Sovak

External links
 Scientists Trace the Origin of Our Teeth to Primitive Fish More Than 400 Million Years Back in Time. On: ScitechDaily. Source: European Synchrotron Radiation Facility. July 12, 2020
 Valéria Vaškaninová, Donglei Chen, Paul Tafforeau, Zerina Johanson, Boris Ekrt, Henning Blom and Per Erik Ahlberg: “Marginal dentition and multiple dermal jawbones as the ancestral condition of jawed vertebrates”. In: Science. 10 July 2020. doi:10.1126/science.aaz9431

Acanthothoracids
Placoderms of Europe
Placoderm genera
Fossil taxa described in 1950